The Europe/Africa Zone was one of three zones of regional competition in the 2011 Fed Cup.

Group I
Venue: Municipal Tennis Club, Eilat, Israel (hard, outdoors)
Date: 2–5 February

The fifteen teams were divided into three pools of four teams and one pool of three. The four pool winners took part in play-offs to determine the two nations advancing to the World Group II Play-offs. The nations finishing last in their pools took part in play-offs, with the two losing nations relegated to Group II in 2012.

Pools

Play-offs

 and  advanced to World Group II play-offs.

Group II
Venue: Smash Tennis Academy, Cairo, Egypt (clay, outdoors)
Date: Week of 2 May (ties played 4–7 May)

The seven teams were divided into one pool of four teams and one pool of three. The top nation from each pool played off against the runner-up from the other with the two winning teams promoted to the Europe/Africa Zone Group I for 2012. The third place nation from each pool played off against the last place nation of the other, with the two losing nations relegated to Group III in 2012.

Pools

Play-offs

 and  promoted to Europe/Africa World Group I in 2012.

Group III
Venue: Smash Tennis Academy, Cairo, Egypt (clay, outdoors)
Date: Week of 2 May (ties played 2–7 May)

The nine teams were divided into one pool of five teams and one pool of four. The top nation from each pool played off against the runner-up from the other with the two winning teams promoted to the Europe/Africa Zone Group II for 2012.

Pools

Play-offs

 and  promoted to Europe/Africa Zone Group II in 2012.
 was reassigned to Europe/Africa Zone Group II for 2012.

See also
Fed Cup structure

References

 Fed Cup 2011, Europe/Africa, Group I
 Fed Cup 2011, Europe/Africa, Group II
 Fed Cup 2011, Europe/Africa, Group III

External links
 Fed Cup website

 
Europe Africa
Sport in Eilat
Tennis tournaments in Israel
Sports competitions in Cairo
Tennis tournaments in Egypt